The Movement for the Restoration of Democracy (MRD), was a historically left-wing populism and massive socialist political alliance formed to oppose and end the military government of President General Zia-ul-Haq. Directed and chaired by Benazir Bhutto of Pakistan Peoples Party, its primary objectives and aims were to restoration of the democracy as well as gaining the civilian control of the military.

Formed in February 1981, the alliance was noted for its left-wing orientation and had Pakistan Peoples Party (PPP), Awami National Party (ANP), Pakistan Muslim League (Khwaja Khairuddin group), Pakistan Democratic Party, Tehreek-e-Istiqlal, Awami Tehreek, Jamiat-e-Ulema-e-Islam, and Mazdoor Kisan Party. The alliance was rooted in rural areas of Sindh Province and remained mostly nonviolent, was strongest among supporters of the Pakistan People's Party (PPP). Though it launched one of the most massive nonviolent movements in South Asia since the time of Gandhi, failure to expand beyond its southern stronghold combined with effective repression from the military led to its demise a year and half later. Although effective in its strategies, the alliance more quickly dissolved after the death of President Zia-ul-Haq in 1988 which marked its way for peaceful general elections, outlined the return of Pakistan Peoples Party in national power.

Formation
In the 1970s, the events leading to the success of right-wing alliance, PNA, toppled and overthrow the government of left-oriented PPP. At the time of death of Zulfikar Ali Bhutto, nearly 3,000 PPP activists and supporters were jailed, many of whom remained imprisoned for the next decade. President General Zia-ul-Haq was particularly unpopular in the Sindh Province, where support for the PPP remained relatively strong. In 1979, President General Zia-ul-Haq announced the implementation of Islamization program and pressed his ultraconservatism policies in the country. Following the invasive Russian invasion of Afghanistan, President Zia exercised more repressive policies to curb the communist influence in the country, whilst escalating the insurgency in Pashtun-domaniated Khyber province in Western Pakistan. In response, the former rivals, ANP and CPP, decided to oppose President Zia's actions in the country, ultimately the left-wing sphere formed the alliance with the PPP which being the influential of all left-wing parties.

In 1980, PPP persuasively reached out to left-wing organizations in the country and started its political function after calling the end of military regime of President Zia-ul-Haq. Negotiations between PPP leaders and the political parties that had formed the Pakistan National Alliance in 1977 started in October 1980. They led to the formation of the MRD on 6 February 1981, at 70 Clifton, the Bhuttos' family house in Karachi. The alliance was dissolved on 24 August 1988. The alliance launched a struggle against the regime of Zia ul-Haq: in the first weeks, 1999 people were arrested, 189 killed and 126 injured.

The movement is generally thought of as two separate outburst, one in August and September 1983, and one in 1986. It was particularly strong in rural Sindh, where it was fueled by people's resentment against the state, and it finally took 3 army divisions and helicopters to bring the uprising down.

Military force and repression was used against agitators and the movement was crushed. Despite its set backs, the MRD was significant for mounting a political pressure on President Zia to hold the elections. Convinced that party-based elections would not bring the "positive results" he had been talking of, he decided to hold non-party elections in 1985.  But before doing so, he secured his election as president through a referendum.

In 1984, Benazir Bhutto and the MRD notably boycotted the 1984 presidential referendum, following making another call for boycotting the 1985 general elections, to be held under President Zia-ul-Haq.  Successfully boycotting the 1984 referendum and 1985 election, proved to be a serious miscalculation despite confident of enjoying huge popular support.  Contrary to MRD's expectations, the voters turned to these polls were in large numbers. The MRD soon realized that it had miscalculated badly, that it should have fought the elections on Zia’s terms.

The PML, JeI, and MQM were the only parties which contested in the election, while the MRD boycotted the election. To a greater extent, the MRD's was hailing from Sindh where the left-wing orientation was much stronger than any other provinces of the country. The Communist Party, with the support from USSR, began its political operations in Sindh and ultimately calling for civil disobedience against the military regime. In response, the communist party leader, Jam Saqi, was brought to a secret trial in Sindh High Court, later directed to military courts. The MRD had united the left-wing mass of the country and the most prominent leaders of the MRD were: Nusrat Bhutto, her daughter Benazir Bhutto, Rasul Bux, Abdul Wali Khan, Jam Saqi, Syed Muhammad Kaswar Gardezi among others. Thousands of the activists were jailed across the country especially in Sindh.

MRD Composition

Reception

Controversy regarding the Foreign support

The foreign policy historian of Pakistan noted that MRD's one of the two leading parties, ANP and CPP, had gained popular and financial support from the Soviet Union in the 1980s. Holding a press conference in 1983, President Zia-ul-Haq portrayed the MRD as an Indian-backed conspiracy to destabilize Pakistan was without merit, but gained credence among some Pakistanis when Indian Prime Minister Indira Gandhi endorsed the movement in an address to the lower house of the Indian parliament.

Despite charges to the contrary, the MRD in Sindh was not attempting to secede from Pakistan but instead was focused on the restoration of the constitution. President Zia’s interior secretary, Roedad Khan, later wrote that the regime was able to manipulate this perception to their advantage and prevent the MRD from gaining greater appeal on a nationwide level.

Aftermath of USSR Collapse

By 1983, the MRD effectively regained enough momentum to reassert itself and President Zia sensed the MRD would likely choose Independence Day to renew its offensive. As a counterattack on MRD, he announced a plan for the restoration of democracy on 12 August 1983. However, Zia’s speech elaborated merely an intention to move toward democracy rather than any specific proposals. Details regarding the role of the military, the 1973 constitution, and the future of political parties were left unclear.

The MRD could not sustained itself in late 1988 and quickly collapse after the death of President Zia-ul-Haq in 1988 which marked its way for peaceful general elections, outlined the return of Pakistan Peoples Party in national power. Furthermore, the events led to a dissolution of USSR also shattered the left in Pakistan. The break-up of the USSR generated hopelessness and desperation in among the communist parties. Sensing the tension and desperation for survival in the politics, Benazir Bhutto consolidated the shattered left in the country, turning the communist mass into the principles of Social democracy. The early 1990s were a period of counter-revolutionary consciousness in Pakistan, giving birth to the rise of fundamentalism.

References

Links
MRD Movement

1980s in Pakistan
Awami National Party
Communist Party of Pakistan
Defunct political party alliances in Pakistan
Jamiat Ulema-e-Islam (F) politicians
Military government of Pakistan (1977–1988)
Pakistan People's Party
Pakistan–Soviet Union relations
Pakistani democracy movements
Political repression in Pakistan